Rosa la rose, fille publique is a French film by Paul Vecchiali, released in 1985.

Synopsis
Rosa is a 20 year old prostitute, the beauty of Les Halles. She is healthy and radiant and  does not refuse any fantasy. Men jostle for a pass with her. Her relationship with her pimp is upended when she falls in love with a laborer after meeting at a banquet.  She ponders starting a new life with him, but there are consequences.

Cast 
 Marianne Basler : Rosa
 Jean Sorel : Gilbert
 Pierre Cosso: Julien
 Laurent Lévy : Laurent
 Catherine Lachens : « Quarante »
 Evelyne Buyle : « Trente-cinq »
 Pierre Oudrey : Paulo
 Heinz Schwarzinger : le mataf
 Régine Benedetti : Yvette
 Jean-Louis Rolland : Pierrot
 Jean Bollery : Dédé
 Pascal Guiomar : le serveur
 René Joly : l'accordéonniste
 Stéphane Jobert : Jules
 Daniel Briquet : le légionnaire
 Michel Valette : l'homme bonheur
 Jacques Nolot : Alex
 Noël Simsolo : Jeannot
 Pierre Villaret et Mathieu Rivolier : les hommes
 Claude Hernin-Hilbaut : l'infirmière
 Louis-Michel Colla : le patron du café
 Patrick Fierry : un client
 Marie-Claude Treilhou : « France Profonde »

Awards and nominations
For her role in the film, Marianne Basler was nominated for the César Award for Most Promising Actress at the 12th César Awards.

References

External links
 
 

1985 drama films
1985 films
French drama films
Films directed by Paul Vecchiali
1980s French films